The West Brock River is a tributary of the Brock River, Brock River, flowing into the Eeyou Istchee Baie-James, in Jamésie, in the administrative region of Nord-du-Québec, in the province of Quebec, in the Canada. The course of the river crosses successively (from the upstream) the townships of La Rochette, Livillier and La Touche.

The lower portion of the "West Brock River" hydrographic slope is accessible by a few forest roads from the south where route 113 connects Lebel-sur-Quévillon to Chibougamau. This road goes south of Opémisca Lake.

The surface of the "West Brock River" is usually frozen from early November to mid-May, however, safe ice circulation is generally from mid-November to mid-April.

Geography

Toponym
This hydronym evokes the memory of Reginald W. Brock, who, at the end of the 1896 geological exploration campaign, was assistant to Dr. Robert Bell of the Geological Survey of Canada, made a rapid geological reconnaissance of the road between the lakes Waswanipi Lake and Mistassini through the rivers Waswanipi, Chibougamau and Barlow and the Lake Waskonichi. Reginald W. Brock, Director of the Geological Survey of Canada, provided the work maps and survey instruments for the 1910 Chibougamau Geological Survey (Quebec) expedition.

The toponym "Brock River West" was formalized on December 5, 1968, at the Commission de toponymie du Québec, i.e. at the creation of this commission

References

See also 

Rivers of Nord-du-Québec
Nottaway River drainage basin
Eeyou Istchee James Bay